Events in the year 1936 in Germany.

Incumbents

National level
Head of State and Chancellor

 Adolf Hitler (the Führer) (Nazi Party)

Events
 6 February — The IV Olympic Winter Games open in Garmisch-Partenkirchen, Germany.
 7 March — In violation of the Treaty of Versailles,  Germany reoccupies the Rhineland.
 29 March — German election and referendum, 1936
 26 June — Focke-Wulf Fw 61, the first practical, functional helicopter, first flown.
 1 August — The 1936 Summer Olympics open in Berlin, Germany, at the end of the first ever Olympic torch relay. It is also the first occasion in world history when a sporting event is given television coverage.
 The first German volunteers on the nationalist side of the Spanish civil war leave for Spain.
 30 August — Ernest Nash flees Germany for Rome.
 8–14 September — The 8th Nazi Party Congress is held and called the "Rally of Honour" (Reichsparteitag der Ehre) in reference to the remilitarization of the Rhineland in March.
 26 November — The Anti-Comintern Pact is signed by Germany and Japan.

Births
10 January — Walter Bodmer, German-English geneticist and academic
14 January — Reiner Klimke, German equestrian (died 1999)
27 January — Wolfgang Böhmer, German politician
9 February — Georg Sterzinsky, German cardinal (died 2011)
9 March — Wittekind, Prince of Waldeck and Pyrmont, head of house of Waldeck and Pyrmont
11 March — Harald zur Hausen, German virologist 
13 March — Lothar Ahrendt, German politician
16 March — Elisabeth Volkmann, German actress (died 2006)
30 March — Erwin J. Haeberle, German physician (died 2021)
8 April — Klaus Löwitsch, German actor (died 2002)
22 April — Dieter Kronzucker, German journalist
9 May — Ulrich Kienzle, German journalist (died 2020)
12 May — Klaus Doldinger, German saxophonist
16 May
Karl Lehmann, German Roman Catholic Cardinal prelate, Bishop of Mainz (died 2018)
Manfred Stolpe, German politician (died 2019)
21 May — Günter Blobel, German biologist (died 2018)
26 May — Franz Magnis-Suseno, German-born Indonesian Jesuit priest 
29 May
Wyn Hoop, German singer
Klaus Winter, German judge (died 2000)
1 June — Peter Sodann, German actor
9 June — Jürgen Schmude, German politician
14 June — Wolfgang Behrendt, German boxer
21 June — Hans Köhler, German swimmer
22 July — Klaus Bresser, German journalist and television presenter
25 June — Bert Hölldobler, German sociobiologist and evolutionary biologist
28 June — Walter Köstner, German fencer
1 July — Lea Rosh, German television journalist, publicist, entrepreneur and political activist
2 July — Rex Gildo, German singer (died 1999)
7 July — Egbert Brieskorn, German mathematician (died 2013)
22 July — Klaus Bresser, German journalist
1 August — Carl, Duke of Württemberg, German nobleman (died 2022)
5 August  — Hans Hugo Klein, German judge
20 August — Kessler Twins, German singers
29 September — Hans D. Ochs, German immunologist
10 October — Gerhard Ertl, German physicist
12 October — Inge Brück, German singer
13 October — Hans Joachim Meyer, German linguist and politician
5 November — Uwe Seeler, German footballer (died 2022)
15 November — Wolf Biermann, German singer and songwriter
8 December — Helmut Markwort, German journalist and magazine founder
17 December — Klaus Kinkel, German politician (died 2019)

Deaths 

 16 January - Oskar Barnack, German inventor and German photographer (born 1879)
 6 February - Wilhelm Solf, German diplomat (born 1862)
 20 February — Max Schreck, German actor (born 1879)
 9 April - Ferdinand Tönnies, German sociologist (born 1855)
 18 April - Richard Lipinski, German politician (born 1867)
 4 May - Ludwig von Falkenhausen, German general (born 1844)
 8 May - Oswald Spengler, German historian (born 1880)
 22 May - Joseph Koeth, German politician (born 1870)
 24 July - Georg Michaelis, German politician, former chancellor of Germany (born 1857)
 20 August - Heinrich Cunow, German politician (born 1862)
 1 September - Konstantin Schmidt von Knobelsdorf, German general (born 1860)
 7 September — Erich Büttner, German painter (born 1889)
 9 October — Friedrich von Oppeln-Bronikowski, German writer (born 1873)
 19 December - Theodor Wiegand, German archaeologist (born 1864)
 27 December  Hans von Seeckt, German chief of staff (born 1866)

References

 
Years of the 20th century in Germany
Germany
Germany